Andrew John Carter  (born 25 January 1974) is a British Conservative Party politician, who was elected as the Member of Parliament (MP) for Warrington South at the 2019 general election.

Biography
Carter was privately educated at Worksop College. He went on to study Economics at the University of Leicester. In 2011 he attended Wharton School of the University of Pennsylvania in the United States.

Carter was group managing director of Manchester-based GMG Radio before the group was taken over by Global Radio in 2014. After leaving radio he worked in a family business and ran a consultancy firm. He was selected as the Conservative candidate for Warrington South in March 2019. He was elected to the seat at the general election in December that year, gaining the seat from the Labour incumbent. He is a volunteer magistrate.

It was reported that Carter was the MP with second highest expenses in 2020.

Personal life
Carter lives in Lymm with his wife, Aggie, and a son, Harry.

References

External links

1974 births
Living people
UK MPs 2019–present
Conservative Party (UK) MPs for English constituencies
GMG Radio
British radio executives
People educated at Worksop College
Alumni of the University of Leicester
Wharton School of the University of Pennsylvania alumni